"Givers and Takers" is a song written by Craig Bickhardt, and recorded by American country music group Schuyler, Knobloch, and Bickhardt.  It was released in April 1988 as the third single from the album No Easy Horses.  The song reached #8 on the Billboard Hot Country Singles & Tracks chart.

Charts

Weekly charts

Year-end charts

References

1988 singles
S-K-O songs
Songs written by Craig Bickhardt
Song recordings produced by James Stroud
MTM Records singles
1988 songs